Sports Leadership and Management Charter School (SLAM) is a public charter school for intermediate and secondary grade levels in Little Havana, Miami, Florida.

There are two other SLAM campuses: By 2015 the Henderson, Nevada campus opened, and in 2016 the West Palm Beach, Florida campus opened.

The rapper Pitbull founded SLAM, which opened in 2013. He chose to focus the school on vocational studies to attract students who were uninterested in academic subjects. He formed a partnership between the school and the Miami Marlins.

Programs
By 2021 the Miami campus had the only high school student-operated Sirius XM station.

References

External links
 Sports Leadership and Management Charter School

Schools in Miami
High schools in Miami
Public middle schools in Florida
Public high schools in Miami-Dade County, Florida
Charter schools in Florida